Coleophora fengxianica is a moth of the family Coleophoridae. It is found in Shaanxi, China.

References
 , 2000: Studies on the Chinese Coleophoridae (Lepidoptera): the Coleophora absinthii group, with description of one new species. Acta Entomologica Sinica 43 (2): 188–192.

fengxianica
Moths described in 2000
Moths of Asia